John Bond may refer to:

Politics
John Bond (MP for Leominster), Member of Parliament (MP) for Leominster in 1402
John Bond (MP for Coventry), MP for Coventry
John Bond (1678–1744), British MP for Corfe Castle, 1721–1722
John Bond (1717–1784), British MP for Corfe Castle, 1727–1761 and 1764–1780
John Bond (1753–1824), British MP for Corfe Castle, 1780–1801
John Bond (1802–1844), British MP for Corfe Castle, 1823–1828

Science
John Bond (classicist) (1550–1612), English classical scholar, physician and Member of Parliament
John Bond (physicist) (born 1956), English forensic scientist
Dick Bond (astrophysicist) (John Richard Bond, born 1950), Canadian astrophysicist and cosmologist

Sport
John Bond (American football coach) (born 1962), American football coach
John Bond (footballer) (1932–2012), English footballer and club manager
John Bond (quarterback) (born 1961), American football quarterback
John Bond (rugby league) (born 1929), New Zealand rugby league player
Jack Bond (cricketer) (John David Bond, 1932–2019), English cricketer
John Kerry Bond (born 1945), Canadian ice hockey forward
John Bond (rugby union) ( 1892 – after 1921), Australian rugby union player

Others
John Bond (banker) (born 1941), British banker with HSBC and company chairman, Chairman of Vodafone
John Bond (jurist) (1612–1676), Master of Trinity Hall, Cambridge and Professor of Law at Gresham College
John Adikes Bond (born 1955), American author, writer, poker player
John James Bond (1810–1883), English chronologist
John Bond (judge) (born 1960),  judge of the Supreme Court of Queensland, Australia
John Linnell Bond (1764–1837), English architect
John Bond (priest) (born 1945), Dean of Connor
John Bond Jr. (1770–1862), American military officer, Mississippi pioneer and legislator
Johnny Bond (1915–1978), American country music singer